Ben Jay Crossman is a Britishborn South African raised graffiti-style street artist,  concept artist, illustrator, photographer, film producer, and director, known for his collaborations with Roger Ballen and Die Antwoord.

Works

Veronika
Between 2010 and 2015, Crossman painted his graffiti-style street art under the moniker ‘a boy named Veronika’.

A short film about ‘a boy named Veronika’, directed by Crossman, created for the 48 Hour Film Project Johannesburg 2012, achieved second place overall as well as awards for editing, special effects, and sound design.

Streets of Fietas
Between 2010 and 2012 Crossman filmed and released ‘The Streets of Fietas’.

The three part short series follows the lives of those who contribute to and are affected by the vicious cycle of poverty, crime and drug use in Fietas, one of Johannesburg’s poorest suburbs.

Van Coke Kartel
In 2013  Crossman filmed and directed music videos for Van Coke Kartel, ‘Sweef’ featuring ‘Odd Art’, and ‘Chaos’ featuring Jack Parow.

Roger Ballen
Working in collaboration with Roger Ballen on his multi-year art project in the slums of South Africa, Crossman directed, filmed and edited Roger Ballen's Asylum of the Birds (2014) and Roger Ballen's Outland (2015).

Die Antwoord
Between 2009 and 2016, Crossman worked with and toured with Die Antwoord as art curator, photographer and videographer.

References 

Living people
South African artists
Street artists
Graffiti artists
1979 births